And the Plains Are Gleaming is a 1933 German-Hungarian drama film directed by Heinz Hille and starring Rosy Barsony, Károly Sugar and Wolf Albach-Retty. It was shot at the Hunnia Studios in Budapest. The film's sets were designed by the art directors Herbert Lippschitz and Márton Vincze.A separate Hungarian-language version The Old Scoundrel was also made.

Cast
 Rosy Barsony as Baroneß Maria Inockay
 Károly Sugar as Kaspar Borly, Gutsverwalter
 Wolf Albach-Retty as Peter Borly, Husarenleutnant
 Tibor Halmay as Graf Balassa, Leutnant
 Magda Kun as Magda, Marias Freundin
 Heinz Salfner as Baron Inokay
 Hansi Arnstaedt as Baronin Inokay
 Olga Limburg as Gräfin Balassa
 Hans Zesch-Ballot as Thury
 Béla Venczel as General Draskoczy
 Franz Göbels as Untersuchungsrichter
 Emilia Étsy as Frau Perkàl
 Tivadar Bilicsi as 1. Weinreisender
 Hugó Déri as 2. Weinreisender
 Karl Bischof
 Isabella von Papen

References

Bibliography

External links

1933 films
1930s musical drama films
German musical drama films
Hungarian musical drama films
Films of the Weimar Republic
1930s German-language films
Films directed by Heinz Hille
Films set in Hungary
UFA GmbH films
German multilingual films
German black-and-white films
Hungarian multilingual films
1933 multilingual films
1933 drama films
1930s German films